Allium parishii is an uncommon species of wild onion known by the common name Parish's onion. It is native to the Mojave Desert and Sonoran Deserts of California (San Bernardino, Riverside, and San Diego Counties) and Arizona (Yuma and Mohave Counties).

Allium parishii grows from a reddish-brown bulb just over a centimeter long and produces a scape up to about 25 centimeters tall. There is a single cylindrical leaf which is generally longer than the stem. The umbel contains up to 25 dark-veined pale pink flowers with narrow tepals between one and two centimeters long. Anthers and pollen are yellow.

References 

parishii
Flora of the California desert regions
Flora of Arizona
Natural history of the Mojave Desert
Onions
Endemic flora of the United States
Plants described in 1882
Taxa named by Sereno Watson